Central Springs Community School District is a rural, public school district headquartered in Manly, Iowa. The district is located in sections of Cerro Gordo, Floyd, Mitchell, and Worth counties. It serves Manly, Nora Springs, Hanlontown, Plymouth, and Rock Falls.

History
The district was established on July 1, 2011, by the merger of North Central Community School District and Nora Springs–Rock Falls Community School District. The vote to merge the districts, held on September 14, 2010, was successful, with North Central voters doing so on a 431–63 (85.35%) basis and Nora Springs–Rock Falls voters doing so on a 437–262 (59.95%) basis. These two districts had, since 2007, enacted a whole grade sharing program.

"Central Springs" was chosen as the name of the consolidated district as the grade-shared secondary schools already used that name. The projected enrollment of the combined school district upon its tentative formation was 850.

Schools
 Central Springs High School (Manly)
The school colors are royal blue and black, with the former from North Central and the latter from Nora Springs–Rock Falls. The school wanted a mascot showing strength, so the panther was chosen as the mascot.
 Central Springs Middle School (Nora Springs)
 Manly Elementary School
 Nora Springs Elementary School

In 2015, the grade distribution was PK-4 at the elementary level, 5–8 at the middle school level, and 9–12 at the high school level. By 2015, the enrollment had declined further, so the district was considering whether or how to reconfigure grade levels.

Central Springs High School

Athletics
The Panthers participate in the Top of Iowa Conference in the following sports:
Football
Cross Country
Volleyball
Basketball
Bowling
Wrestling
Golf
Track and Field
Baseball
Softball

See also
List of school districts in Iowa
List of high schools in Iowa

References

External links
 Central Springs Community School District

School districts in Iowa
Education in Cerro Gordo County, Iowa
Education in Floyd County, Iowa
Education in Mitchell County, Iowa
Education in Worth County, Iowa
School districts established in 2011
2011 establishments in Iowa